Ihor Vasylyovych Korniyets (born 14 July 1967) is a Ukrainian professional football coach and a former player.

Club career
He made his professional debut in the Soviet Top League in 1988 for FC Dynamo Kyiv.

Honours
 Soviet Top League runner-up: 1988.
 Ukrainian Premier League runner-up: 1995.
 Ukrainian Premier League bronze: 1994.
 Ukrainian Cup winner: 1994.
 Russian Premier League runner-up: 1997.
 Russian Premier League bronze: 1996.
 Russian Cup finalist: 1995 (his miss in the shootout lost his team, FC Rotor Volgograd, the cup).

European club competitions
With FC Rotor Volgograd.

 UEFA Cup 1995–96: 4 games.
 UEFA Intertoto Cup 1996: 8 games.

References

1967 births
Living people
Footballers from Kyiv
Soviet footballers
Ukrainian footballers
Association football midfielders
Ukrainian expatriate footballers
Expatriate footballers in Poland
Expatriate footballers in Russia
Soviet Top League players
Ukrainian Premier League players
Russian Premier League players
FC Ros Bila Tserkva players
FC Dynamo Kyiv players
FC Metalurh Zaporizhzhia players
FC Shakhtar Donetsk players
Lech Poznań players
FC Chornomorets Odesa players
FC Rotor Volgograd players
FC Arsenal Tula players
FC Enerhiya Yuzhnoukrainsk players
Ukrainian football managers
FC Real Pharma Odesa managers